Real Shore FC was an American soccer team, founded in 2006. The team was a member of the National Premier Soccer League (NPSL), and played in the Eastern Conference. The team folded after the 2007 season.

The team played its home games in the stadium at Brookdale Community College in Lincroft, New Jersey, in the Jersey Shore area of the state of New Jersey. The team was affiliated with the long-established WPSL team of the same name.

External links
 Real Shore Website 

 
Defunct soccer clubs in New Jersey
Monmouth County, New Jersey
2006 establishments in New Jersey
2007 disestablishments in New Jersey
Association football clubs established in 2006
Association football clubs disestablished in 2007